A harmonium or pump organ is a reed organ that generates sound with foot- or hand-pumped bellows.

Harmonium may also refer to:

Harmonium (fictional creature), a creature in the 1959 novel The Sirens of Titan
Harmonium (poetry collection), a 1923 collection of poetry by Wallace Stevens 
 Hooke's atom or harmonium, an artificial helium-like atom
 Former name for a restricted Boltzmann machine, a generative stochastic neural network
 The earliest ringtone maker, released in 1997
 Harmonium (film), a 2016 Japanese film

Music 
Harmonium (Adams), a large-scale work for orchestra and chorus by American composer John Coolidge Adams
Harmonium (band), a 1970s Québécois band
Harmonium (Harmonium album), the eponymous release by the same band
Harmonium (Vanessa Carlton album), a 2004 album by Vanessa Carlton
A song by P-MODEL from the album One Pattern
Harmonium, alternative name for the Appalachian dulcimer

See also
Melodeon (disambiguation)